The 1986–87 Primera División de Fútbol Profesional season is the 36th tournament of El Salvador's Primera División since its establishment of the National League system in 1948. The tournament was scheduled to end in December 1986. On October 10, a 5.7 Earthquake struck San Salvador. The league postponed many games and the final round finally ended in February 1987. At the end of the regular season, the top 4 teams took part in the final group stage. Alianza, the best team in the final group, won the championship match against a Águila, the best regular season team.

Teams

Managerial changes

During the season

League standings

4th Place Playoff

Final round standings

Final

Top scorers

List of foreign players in the league
This is a list of foreign players in 1986-1987. The following players:
have played at least one game for the respective club.
have not been capped for the El Salvador national football team on any level, independently from the birthplace

Acajutla
 

C.D. Águila
  Ned Barbosa
  Eduardo Santana 
  Juan Carlos Carreño
  Ramón Maradiaga 
  Nahún Corro

Alianza F.C.
  Óscar Biegler 
  Ruben Alonso
  Carlos Reyes
  Hernán Sosa

Atletico Marte
 

Chalatenango
  Arnaldo Martínez
  Marco Pereira

C.D. FAS
  Miguel Angel Perez
  Ademar Benitez

 (player released mid season)
  (player Injured mid season)
 Injury replacement player

C.D. Luis Ángel Firpo
 

CESSA Metapan
  Tony Laing
  Richardson Smith
  Raul Centeno Gamboa 
  Palic Castillo

Soyapango FC
 

Once lobos
  Byron perez
  Jorge ''La Chana” Fernández

UCA
 

UES

External links
 
 
 
 

1987
1986–87 in Salvadoran football